Coucoucache (officially designated as Coucoucache 24A) was a tiny First Nation reserve, in Cloutier Township, on the north shore of Reservoir Blanc on the Saint-Maurice River in the Mauricie region of Quebec, Canada. It belonged to the Atikamekw First Nation of Wemotaci but had no permanent population in recent decades.

History
In 1806, explorer Jean-Baptiste Perrault reported on "the small Kôukôukache River that flows by a rocky mountain where there are 11 portages to get to the Grand Kôukôukache." This name came from the word kôkôkachi, meaning "owl". It was also the name of the former Coucoucache Lake, where the Hudson's Bay Company had maintained a trading post, called Coocoocache, since at least 1823 (closed circa 1913). Coucoucache Lake, part of a chain of lakes on the Saint-Maurice River, may have been named after a small mountain in the shape of an owl that was situated at the eastern end of the lake. However, legend has it that a fight developed between the Atikamekw and the Iroquois at this lake, and when the Atikamekw imitated an owl's cry, they sprung on the Iroquois and massacred them.

Two years later, these lands were distributed among the Atikamekw, Algonquins, and Abenakis by John Rolph, Commissioner of Crown Lands. On August 9, 1853, the reserves, including Coucoucache, were approved by the Governor General in Council. In 1895, the original Coucoucache Reserve was surveyed and covered 380 acres (1.54 km2).

In 1932, the Rapide-Blanc Dam was constructed, leading to the formation of the Reservoir Blanc that inundated Coucoucache Lake and Reserve. The new Coucoucache Reserve on the north shore of the reservoir replaced the old one but was only 12 acres (0.05 km2) in size. For the loss of land, the Shawinigan Water & Power Company paid the Canadian government the amount of $380.

Land history 
 1851-08-30: Act of 1851, consisting of the setting aside of land not exceeding 93,080 hectares (230,000 acres) for the use of Indians.
 1853-08-09: Order in Council, distribution of land set aside by the 1851 Act on the lands of La Tuque - Approximate Area: 5,666 hectares (14,000 acres).
 1867-07-01: Act, 1867, jurisdiction of the Government of Canada on the Indians and lands reserved for Indians.
 1895-12-05: Surveying land for Coucoucache, Canton Cloutier, Part undivided - Area: 153.78 hectares (380 acres).
 1925-12-31: Act of 1925, reservation lands not exceeding 133,550 hectares (330,000 acres) for the benefit of Indians by the transfer of the usufruct.
 1931-10-27: Surveying land for new Coucoucache, Canton Cloutier, Part undivided an area of 4.85 hectares (12 acres).
 1932-01-16: Order in Council 93 transfer governance and administration of the Government of Quebec to Government of Canada. Township Cloutier, Part undivided. Area: 4.85 hectares (12 acres).
 1937-12-01: Order in Council 2984, acceptance of transfer (1932) by Government of Canada. Surrender to Government of Quebec reserve Coucoucache (1851) under the Indian Act (RSC 1927, c. 98, art. 48).

Current situation:
 Canton Cloutier, Part undivided land acquired under the Act of 1925. Transfer governance and administration of Government of Quebec to Government of Canada by Order in Council 93 (1932-01-16). Area: 4.85 hectares (12 acres)

Demographics
Population trend:
 Population in 2006: 0
 Population in 2001: 0
 Population in 1996: 0
 Population in 1991: 0

See also 

 La Tuque (urban agglomeration)
 Rapides-des-Coeurs Generating Station

References

External links
 Conseil de la Nation Atikamekw
 Wemotaci Nation official website

Atikamekw
Communities in Mauricie
Indian reserves in Quebec
Hudson's Bay Company trading posts
La Tuque, Quebec